Boxford may refer to:

 Boxford, Berkshire, England
 Boxford railway station
 Boxford, Suffolk, England
 Boxford, Massachusetts, United States
 Boxford (CDP), Massachusetts
 Boxford, Missouri, United States
 Boxford Lathe, a brand of machine tool